Costulopsis  is a genus of minute sea snails, marine gastropod molluscs in the family Cerithiopsidae.

Species
Species in the genus Costulopsis  include:
 Costulopsis adusta (Cecalupo & Perugia, 2018)
 Costulopsis albocincta (Melvill & Standen, 1896)
 Costulopsis ambigua (Cecalupo & Perugia, 2013)
 Costulopsis buzzurroi (Cecalupo & Robba, 2010)
 Costulopsis denticulata (Cecalupo & Robba, 2010)
 Costulopsis granata (Kay, 1979)
 Costulopsis hadfieldi (Jay & Drivas, 2002)
 Costulopsis impedita (Cecalupo & Perugia, 2012)
 Costulopsis iuxtafuniculata (Rolán, Espinosa & Fernández-Garcés, 2007)
 Costulopsis mactanensis (Cecalupo & Perugia, 2012)
 Costulopsis myia (Jay & Drivas, 2002)
 Costulopsis nana (Jeffreys, 1867)
 Costulopsis noninii (Cecalupo & Perugia, 2012)
 Costulopsis pickeringae (Jay & Drivas, 2002)
 Costulopsis poppearum (Cecalupo & Perugia, 2012)
 Costulopsis skolix (Jay & Drivas, 2002)
 Costulopsis tenuicolorata (Cecalupo & Perugia, 2012)
Species brought into synonymy
 Costulopsis albovittata (C. B. Adams, 1850): synonym of Cerithiopsis albovittata (C. B. Adams, 1850)
 Costulopsis beneitoi (Rolán, Espinosa & Fernández-Garcés, 2007): synonym of Cerithiopsis beneitoi Rolán, Espinosa & Fernández-Garcés, 2007
 Costulopsis familiarum (Rolán, Espinosa & Fernández-Garcés, 2007): synonym of Cerithiopsis familiarum Rolán, Espinosa & Fernández-Garcés, 2007
 Costulopsis parvada (Rolán, Espinosa & Fernández-Garcés, 2007): synonym of Cerithiopsis parvada Rolán, Espinosa & Fernández-Garcés, 2007

References

 Cecalupo A. & Robba E. (2010) The identity of Murex tubercularis Montagu, 1803 and description of one new genus and two new species of the Cerithiopsidae (Gastropoda: Triphoroidea). Bollettino Malacologico 46: 45-64.
 Cecalupo A. & Robba E. (2019). Costulopsis nom. nov., a replacement name for the Gastropoda genus Nanopsis Cecalupo & Robba, 2010 (Mollusca: Gastropoda: Cerithiopsidae), preoccupied by Nanopsis Henningsmoen, 1954 (Arthropoda: Ostracoda: Beyrichiidae). Bollettino Malacologico. 55(1): 65-67.

Cerithiopsidae
Gastropod genera